Lim Chi Jung, (September 26, 1880 – January 9, 1932), was a Korean independence activist and supporter of the Korean Independence Movement.

Biography

Early life
Born in 1880 in the region of Pyong Aang Nam-Do, Korea, Lim received 7–8 years of education before leaving school in 1900. Three years later, at the age of 23, Lim traveled to Oahu, Hawaii to work as a labourer. In Hawaii he worked on a plantation and educated himself in his spare time. It was during this period that Lim developed nationalistic sentiments.

By 1904, Lim had moved to San Francisco where he began learning English formally. While a student, he met Ahn Chang-ho, a Korean independence activist and one of the early leaders of the Korean-American immigrant community in the United States.

Participation of the Korean Independence movement in the US
At the end of the Russo-Japanese War in 1905, Japan invaded and colonized Korea. Horrified that their country's sovereignty was under threat, Lim, Ahn, and other like-minded Koreans formed a group which later became the New People's Association, a clandestine organization whose aim was to foster the independence and national strength of the Korean Empire, by promoting national feeling among Koreans and Korean-Americans living in America.  The New People's Association also served as the unofficial Korean consulate in America while Korea was under Japanese rule.

In November 1905, Korea was pressured into signing the Eulsa Treaty, which handed full control of the Korean peninsula to Japan. Following this, Lim and others formed a nationalist newspaper called Gong-lib Shinbo, of which Lim was chief administrator, to campaign for their country and to promote national pride.  Japan viewed the activities of Lim's organisations with disfavour, but were unable to take any action on American soil.

Lim was also a leader in Shinminhoe, a Korean-American immigrant community group (신민회), and served as secretary for The Korea Daily News [대한매일신보(大韓每日申報)].

Korean Independence Movement
In 1906, Ahn Chang-ho returned to Korea, bringing the New People's Association with him. Lim followed in 1907. They established bases in first in Pyongyang and Seoul, then nationwide. They supported education, industrialization, and military action for independence.

:105-Man Incident 
In 1910, Lim was implicated after an attempt was made to assassinate Masatake Terauchi, the Governor-General of Korea (Chôsen Sôtoku). A young Korean man named An Myeong-Gun, was alleged to have attempted to shoot Terauchi at Suncheon Station. An was a cousin of An Jung-geun buddah, a Korean independence activist who assassinated Itō Hirobumi (伊藤博文), the first Prime Minister of Japan and then-Japanese Resident-General of Korea in 1906.  The event would later become known as the Suncheon Incident or the 105 Man Incidents.

After the failed attempt, the Governor-General arrested over 700 Koreans. In 1912, 122 were tried, and 105 sentenced to imprisonment with hard labor. In the end, only six Koreans had their sentences imposed, and even they were amnestied in 1915.

It has been claimed that the plot was fabricated by the Japanese authorities to weaken and discredit the Korean independence movement. Certainly, after the failed attempt to assassinate Terauchi, the New People's Association came under close scrutiny. After Lim and other key members of the New People's Association were captured, the organization was disbanded.

March 1st Movement
In February 1919, after two Korean independence fighters - Jung Shung Kyong and Lee Sung Hun – were jailed, Lim and other members of the New People's Association set about planning a mass protest against Japanese occupation. The March 1st Movement, or Samil Movement, was one of the earliest public displays of Korean resistance during the Japanese occupation of Korea.  On March 1, 1919, Lim's comrades began their four-week-long protest in Nampho, North Korea. The campaign was violent and many of the protesters were jailed, but there was a major shift in Japanese imperial policy towards Korea. Although Lim was not directly involved in the protest, he was recognized as one of its architects.

Death and legacy
In 1923, in order to continue the Korean Independence Movement, Lim and his fellow activists established another nationalist newspaper Shi Dae Ilbo.

Lim retired in 1928 and the newspaper stopped publishing due to internal conflicts and pressure from the Japanese. Lim's dedication to the Korean Independence Movement had begun to take a toll on his health. He became distressed by Japan's stranglehold over his country, and the inability of the Korean Independence Movement to loosen it. He turned to alcohol as a way of coping with the pain and stress.

On January 10, 1932, Lim died of a cerebral hemorrhage in Seodaemun, Seoul.

In 1968, the Korean government officially recognized Lim's efforts for the Korean Independence Movement by awarding him with the Order of Merit for National Foundation in the grade of Dongnip Jang (독립장; "Order of Independence").

References

 "Lim Chi Jung," Naver  (25 January 2011)
 "Independence Movement Fighter of the Month (January 2007) Lim Chi Jung" [1] (7 January 2007)
 "January 2007 Independence Movement Fighter of the Month Lim Chi Jung" [2] (29 December 2006)

1880 births
1932 deaths
Korean independence activists